Wonderful Crazy Night Tour was a concert tour by English musician Elton John taking place in Europe, North America, South America and Australia in 2016 and 2017.

Background
On 20 October 2015, John's Official Website announced concerts taking place in Lincoln, Leicester and Exeter in the summer of 2016 under the banner of the Wonderful Crazy Night Tour in support of John's upcoming 32nd studio album. The previous day two intimate shows were announced in Paris. The poster for the two intimate Paris concerts effectively leaked information, including cover art and release dates for John's upcoming album before any official announcement was made. On 27 October 2015 five concerts were announced, taking place in Germany, directly before John's concerts in the United Kingdom.

Set list
This set list is representative of the concert in Berlin, Germany on 7 July 2017. It does not represent the set list at all concerts for the duration of the tour.

"The Bitch Is Back"
"Bennie and the Jets"
"Take Me to the Pilot"
"Daniel"
"Looking Up"
"A Good Heart"
"Philadelphia Freedom"
"I Want Love"
"Tiny Dancer"
"Levon"
"Rocket Man"
"Have Mercy on the Criminal"
"Your Song"
"Burn Down the Mission"
"Sad Songs (Say So Much)"
"Don't Let the Sun Go Down on Me"
"I'm Still Standing"
"Crocodile Rock"
"Your Sister Can't Twist (But She Can Rock 'n Roll)"
"Saturday Night's Alright for Fighting"
Encore
"Candle in the Wind"

Tour dates

Cancelled shows

Tour band
Matt Bissonette – Bass guitar, backing vocals
Kim Bullard – Keyboards
Ray Cooper – Percussion
Elton John – Piano, vocals
Davey Johnstone – Guitar, banjo, backing vocals
John Mahon – Percussion, backing vocals
Nigel Olsson – drums, backing vocals

Notes

References

External links

Elton John concert tours
2016 concert tours
2017 concert tours
2018 concert tours
Concerts at Malmö Arena